The 2022 U Sports Women's Volleyball Championship was held March 25–27, 2022, in Calgary, Alberta, to determine a national champion for the 2021–22 U Sports women's volleyball season. The top-seeded Trinity Western Spartans defeated the seventh-seeded Mount Royal Cougars to win the second championship in program history.

Host
The tournament was played at Jack Simpson Gymnasium at the University of Calgary. This was the fifth time that Calgary has hosted the tournament with the most recent occurring in 2007. Calgary had previously been awarded the hosting duties for the 2020 championship, but that event was cancelled due to the COVID-19 pandemic in Canada.

Participating teams

Championship bracket

Bronze medal match

Gold medal match

Consolation bracket

Awards

Championship awards 
 Championship MVP – Avery Heppell, Trinity Western
 R.W. Pugh Fair Play Award – Kenzie Vaandering, Calgary

Mikasa Top Performers Presented by Nike Team 
Trinity Western: Avery Heppell
Mount Royal: Haley Roe

All-Star Team 
Victoria Iannotti, McGill
Kory White, Alberta
Haley Roe, Mount Royal
Quinn Pelland, Mount Royal
Savannah Purdy, Trinity Western
Ansah Odoom, Trinity Western

References

External links 
 Tournament Web Site

U Sports volleyball
2022 in women's volleyball
University of Calgary